World Cultures is  an electronic peer-reviewed academic journal of cross-cultural studies. It was founded in 1985 by Douglas R. White, editor in chief until 1990, followed by Greg Truex 1991, J. Patrick Gray (1992-2014), and Greg Truex (2015-16). William Divale was the publisher until 2008, when the journal moved from print and CD-ROM format to online format. It is hosted as an eScholarship journal that publishes cross-cultural research articles and computerized codebooks and datasets. These include the Standard Cross-Cultural Sample, Western North American Indians, an Atlas of Archaeology, the Ethnographic Atlas (Murdock, 1967), and Lewis Binford's Constructing Frames of Reference: An Analytical Method for Archaeological Theory Building Using Ethnographic and Environmental Data Sets (2001) and numerous other topics. Numerous software programs for cross-cultural analysis have also been published.

Background
Part of the purpose of the journal is to provide codebooks and data that are in the public domain for scientific use, at minimal cost of distribution, both to support scientific work and instructional use. New as well as legacy issues of the journal are at the free on-line site of the California Digital Library. The largest of the databases supported by the journal to date are the contributed multiauthored coded data for the Standard Cross-Cultural Sample, now numbering over 2,000 coded variables on 186 societies by over 90 different contributing authors.

References

External links
 Early website
  Early website
 World Cultures at eScholarship
 About World Cultures

Cross-cultural studies
Cultural journals
Publications established in 1985
English-language journals